Arena is a Swedish-language bi-monthly left-leaning magazine. It publishes reports, interviews and essays on politics and culture. In 2017 the magazine went on online-only format.

History and profile
Arena was founded by Håkan A. Bengtsson and Per Wirtén. It was first published in 1993 under the name Politikens, kulturens & idéernas arena. In 2003 the name was shortened to Arena. The magazine has a socialist political stance. Per Wirtén served as the editor-in-chief of the magazine. Another was Devrim Mavi, a politician. As of 2014 it was one of the four Swedish magazine members of the European magazine-network Eurozine.

Arena published six issues per year and had a circulation of approximately 3,600 copies in 2013.

References

External links
 

1993 establishments in Sweden
2017 disestablishments in Sweden
Bi-monthly magazines published in Sweden
Cultural magazines
Defunct magazines published in Sweden
Magazines established in 1993
Magazines disestablished in 2017
Magazines published in Stockholm
Online magazines with defunct print editions
Swedish-language magazines
Political magazines published in Sweden
Socialist magazines